The Poland men's national under-19 volleyball team is controlled by the Polski Związek Piłki Siatkowej (PZPS), which represents the country in international competitions – U18 European Championship and U19 World Championship.

History
On April 12, 2015 Poland under-19 national team won title of U19 European Champion 2015. They beat in final Italy U19 (3–1). Same team took part in European Youth Olympic Festival. On August 1, 2015 he achieved gold medal (final match with Bulgaria 3–0). Then Polish national U19 team took part in 2015 FIVB U19 World Championship, held in Argentina. They beat in Pool C all opponents (Chinese Taipei, Chile, Bulgaria and Iran) and lost only 2 sets. Then they best Japan (3–0) in round of 16 and went straight to semifinal. On August 22, 2015 Polish national U19 team won semifinal after meeting with Iran (3–1). U19 team qualified to final match for the first time in history. It will be third medal of Poland U19 at World Championship under-19. On August 23, 2015 Poland achieved first title of U19 World Champion. In the finale they beat hosts - Argentina (3–2). The same squad of national team, led by coach Sebastian Pawlik, won 48 matches in the row and never lost (counted also later played under-21 tournaments). The squad roster, consisting mainly of players from the year 1997, has won all possible European and World championships under-19 and under-21.

Statistics

U19 World Championship
 Champions   Runners up   Third place

U19 European Championship
 Champions   Runners up   Third place

U18 European Championship
 Champions   Runners up   Third place

European Youth Olympic Festival
 2003 Paris –  Gold medal
 2009 Tampere –  Gold medal
 2013 Utrecht –  Silver medal
 2015 Tbilisi –  Gold medal
 2017 Győr — 7th place

See also
 Poland men's national U21 volleyball team
 Poland men's national U23 volleyball team
 Poland men's national volleyball team

References

External links
 Official website 

National men's under-19 volleyball teams
National team U19
National team U19
Men's sport in Poland
Youth sport in Poland